There are many Hindu temples in Guwahati, which is why it is also known as the "city of temples". Notable temples include:-

See also
 List of temples in Bhubaneswar

References

Guwahati

Guwahati temples